Covendo Airport  is an airport serving the riverside village of Covendo in the La Paz Department of Bolivia.

The airport runs alongside a bend of the upper Beni River (Alto Beni). There is mountainous terrain nearby, northeast through west.

See also

Transport in Bolivia
List of airports in Bolivia

References

External links
OpenStreetMap - Covendo
OurAirports - Covendo
FallingRain - Covendo Airport

Airports in La Paz Department (Bolivia)